The Copa del Presidente de la República 1932 (President of the Republic's Cup) was the 32nd staging of the Copa del Rey, the Spanish football cup competition.

The competition started on April 10, 1932, and concluded on June 19, 1932, with the final, held at the Estadio Chamartín in Madrid. Athletic Bilbao won their 12th title, the third in a row.

Teams
As in the previous tournaments, the teams qualified through the Regional Championships
Andalusia: Sevilla FC, Betis Balompié
Asturias–Cantabria: Oviedo FC, Sporting de Gijón, Racing de Santander
Balearic Islands: CD Mallorca
Canary Islands: CD Tenerife
Catalonia: FC Barcelona, CD Español, CD Júpiter
Extremadura: Don Benito FC
Galicia: Celta de Vigo, Deportivo La Coruña
Gipuzkoa–Navarre–Aragon: Unión Club, Donostia FC, CD Logroño, CA Osasuna
Murcia: Murcia FC, Imperial FC
Center Region-Aragon: Madrid CF, Athletic Madrid, Valladolid Deportivo, CD Nacional
Valencia: Valencia CF, CD Castellón
Biscay: Athletic Bilbao, CD Alavés, Arenas Club

Round of 32
The first leg was played on April 10. The second leg was played on April 17.

|}
FC Barcelona, Madrid FC, Unión Club and Athletic Bilbao received a bye.

Tiebreaker

|}

Round of 16
The first leg was played on May 8. The second leg was played on May 15.

|}
Tiebreaker

|}

Quarter-finals
The first leg was played on May 22. The second leg was played on May 29.

|}

Semi-finals
The first leg was played on June 5. The second leg was played on June 12.

|}

Final

References

External links
rsssf.com
 linguasport.com

1932
1932 domestic association football cups
Copa